George Maxwell (1804-1880) was an English botanist.

George Maxwell may also refer to:

 George C. Maxwell (1771–1816), American politician
 George Maxwell (Australian politician) (1859–1935), Australian politician
 George Maxwell (administrator) (1871–1959), Chief Secretary of the Federated Malay States
 George Ritchie Maxwell (1857–1902), Canadian Presbyterian minister and politician
 George Maxwell Richards (1931–2018), President of Trinidad and Tobago

See also
 George Clerk-Maxwell (1715–1784), Scottish landowner